Isole is a river which flows through the department of Finistère in the region of Brittany in France. Its source is near Roudouallec. Another town on the Isole is Scaër. At the town of Quimperlé it is joined by the Ellé to form the Laïta, which flows into the Atlantic Ocean at Le Pouldu.

References

Rivers of France
Rivers of Brittany
Rivers of Finistère
Rivers of Morbihan